Faithful Fairy Harmony is the ninth studio album by American singer-songwriter Josephine Foster. It was released on November 18, 2018, by Fire Records.

Critical reception
Faithful Fairy Harmony was met with "generally favorable" reviews from critics. At Metacritic, which assigns a weighted average rating out of 100 to reviews from mainstream publications, this release received an average score of 80 based on 7 reviews. Aggregator Album of the Year gave the release a 73 out of 100 based on a critical consensus of 4 reviews.

Bekki Bemrose of AllMusic said: "The mysteries of love, life, and the world are broached with a light yet nevertheless unshakeable touch on Faithful Fairy Harmony. Foster has made a record that feels like a psychic connection to inner worlds as well as an outer one, and the visions she summons are at once vivid and rarified."

Track listing

Personnel
Credits adapted from AllMusic.

Musicians''
 Josephine Foster – primary artist, producer, harp, organ
 John Allingham – bass, backing vocals
 Chris Davis – drums
 Jon Estes – bass
 Shahzad Ismaily – bass
 Peggy Snow – kazoo
 Victor Herrero – guitarProduction'''
 John Baldwin – mastering
 Andrija Tokic – engineer, mixing

References

2018 albums
Josephine Foster albums
Fire Records (UK) albums